Events from the year 1979 in Pakistan.

Incumbents

Federal government 
President: Muhammad Zia-ul-Haq
Chief Justice: Sheikh Anwarul Haq

Governors 
Governor of Balochistan: Rahimuddin Khan 
Governor of Khyber Pakhtunkhwa: Fazle Haq 
Governor of Punjab: Sawar Khan 
Governor of Sindh: S.M. Abbasi

Events
 4 April – Deposed Prime Minister of Pakistan Zulfikar Ali Bhutto is executed in Rawalpindi.
 21 November – After false radio reports from the Ayatollah Khomeini that the Americans have occupied the Grand Mosque in Mecca, the United States Embassy in Islamabad, Pakistan is attacked by a mob and set afire, killing 4. (See: Foreign relations of Pakistan)
 10 December – Abdus Salam wins the first Nobel prize for the country.

Births
 18 April – Tasqeen Qadeer, cricketer
 30 June – Faisal Shahzad, bomber

See also
1978 in Pakistan
Other events of 1979
1980 in Pakistan
List of Pakistani films of 1979
Timeline of Pakistani history

References

 
Military government of Pakistan (1977–1988)
1979 in Asia